Boureanu or Boureanul is a Romanian surname. Notable people with the surname include:

Cristian Boureanu (born 1972), Romanian businessman and politician
Eugen Boureanul (1885–1971), Romanian writer
Radu Boureanu, Romanian poet, prose writer, and translator

Romanian-language surnames